Wilderness Inner-City Leadership Development (WILD) is located in the center of Seattle Chinatown/International District (CID). This non-profit youth program was found in 1997 by Stella Chao, who was a former executive director for International District Housing Alliance (IDHA). Stella Chao is currently the Director for Department of Neighborhoods in the city of Seattle. WILD is a youth program that's open to immigrants who are in high school  to develop their leadership skills. Every fall, they have a fall program open to students in Seattle Public Schools from age 13-19 to work on projects to make CID a better community. Some youths participate in the Intergenerational Program where they can develop communication skills cross generations in the Asian Pacific Islander community.

History 
International District Housing Alliance (IDHA) is a non-profit organization which has been working for the past 30 years in Seattle's Chinatown/International District to improve life quality for the CID residents. Its initial mission was to provide affordable housing to the low-income community in Chinatown/International District. Throughout the years, IDHA has evolved to meet community needs, from providing affordable housings to leadership development, environmental justice, community building and more. In 1997, the executive director of IDHA found WILD so youths in the community can learn about the environment earlier.

Background 
WILD is a community formed using bottom-up strategies where all members take part in making decisions also get to decide on a specific project they want to work on. Other than big projects (that are partnered with other organizations), WILD members are always encouraged to get involved in community events and activities related to the environment year round. They are actively involved in the spring and fall Chinatown/International District clean-up. While removing graffiti and picking up trash, they also planted plants in CID.  During winter of every year, all the youth help with the Holiday Dinner and Gift Drive host by IDHA. For the gift drive, they go from setting up booths to wrapping and distributing gifts to the low-income family. In addition to all these activities, youth also get access for homework help and help with college applications. WILD has been evaluated by Seattle Partners of Health Communities showing that this program does promotes community-accountability and it incorporated community-defined measures of successes.

Grants 

WILD (under IDHA) had received multiple grants from different funders. One of the grants, CARE from the U.S. Environmental Protection Agency was granted to IDHA. CARE stands for Community Action for a Renewed Environment, is a competitive grant program from EPA that offers money community organizations that are involved in addressing risks of toxic pollution from different sources to the environment. The CARE program financially assist communities with pollution problems to help them reduce the exposure to the pollutants. CARE offers two types of Cooperative Agreements: Level 1 and Level 2, which a different amount of funding granted.

In 2005, IDHA had received Level 1 CARE Cooperative Agreement to address the environmental issues in the Chinatown/International District due to economically disadvantages. This grant will help address the environmental concerns (lead paint in old buildings, air pollution, uneven pavement etc.) in the CID community. WILD youth took part in helping with translation and education in the community to help residents to become aware of the issues.
Level 2 CARE Cooperative Agreement was granted to IDHA in 2007.  This allowed WILD to partner with other organizations to help reduce the pollution in CID. The program continues to work on education and expanding the awareness of the pollution issues in the community. They also work on the "Green Street" campaign using this fund to make CID a dumpster-free community. WILD youths had contributed most of it time working on environmental justice using these funding from 2005 to 2007.

Projects 
WILD have at least one big project a year, mostly focusing on environmental justice, making Chinatown/International District a better place for people to live.

Community Perspective Project 
This is one of the major projects done by WILD youth in the year of 2004. This project used three different ways to gain information about the Chinatown/International District community. ComNETsm (Computerized neighborhood environmental tracking) was used. ComNETsm is hand-held computer allowing the youth to track street and sidewalk conditions by taking pictures matching with the problems (i.e. graffiti, trip hazards and feces). According to Joyce Pisnanont, Youth Program Coordinator for WILD from 2003 to 2007, the program found that ComNETsm only tracks the deficits of the neighborhood so the program decided to supplement the project with Photovoice and multilingual interviews. Through Photovoice, they youth and elders of the CID community are able to express their perspective on what they like or dislike about the community. This project was presented to Seattle City Council, Jim Compton by the youths in early 2005 regarding the safety concerns in Seattle CID. In May 2005, WILD youth brought this project to the Community-Based Solutions for Environmental & Economic Justice 4th Annual Conference at the University of Washington. The main focus of this project is to help the limited-English speaking residents to speak up about health and safety related issues in their community.

Night Market 
After the Community Perspective Project, WILD devoted most of its time on research in developing a night market. The reason for creating a night market is to encourage people in the community to go to public parks after dark. It was believed that developing a night market has helped the public safety issues in the Chinatown/International District. WILD youth took a trip to Richmond Night Market at Canada to observe the night market in action to create a successful event. In August 2006, the first Night Market was held in Hing Hay Park in CID.  There were multiple organizations that helped with creating the pilot night market, including The Chinese Chamber of Commerce, The Community Action Program and The Chinatown/International District Business Improvement Area (CIDBIA). In 2008, the CID Night Market is hosted by CIDBIA and some WILD youths continue to volunteer helping out with the event.

Spill Kits  
Youths are responsible for translating information on recycling and composting. Every summer, during the Summer Festivals in Chinatown, the youth educate the general public about what they can recycle. In 2006, WILD youth distributed Spill Kits to the small businesses in Chinatown and educate them about how to use it. Spill Kits are used to avoid hazardous chemical to get into the water, preventing water pollution.

Public Safety Outreach 
Danny Woo International District Community Garden is the largest green space in CID established in 1975. This community garden allows the elders in CID to grow their native vegetables. In spring 2010, WILD youth devoted their time to make Danny Woo Garden a success by hosting Earth Day in the garden. They introduce more people to the garden and create awareness of the garden to the community. They also promote that the garden is a safe place to spend time at, either having a walk or having a picnic in the garden.

Environmental Outreach 
Duwamish River was listed as the federal superfund site in 2001 by EPA. In 2006, WILD youth took a sailing trip to Duwamish River and learn about the contamination zones of the river along with Salish Sea. As of Fall 2010, WILD youth will start another project related to the Duwamish River.

References 

Non-profit organizations based in Seattle
Organizations established in 1997